Floyd Smith is a professional hockey player.

Floyd Smith may also refer to:

Floyd Smith (musician) (1917–1982), American jazz guitarist and record producer
Floyd Smith (physician) (1885–1961), Medical doctor, Christian missionary and witness to the Armenian Genocide

See also
James Floyd Smith (1884–1956), American test pilot and parachute expert